The Greens is a green political party in Luxembourg.

Party history

1983–93
The Luxembourgish Greens were founded on 23 June 1983 as Green Alternative Party (GAP). Among its founding members were people engaged in the peace movement and the movement against a nuclear power plant in Luxembourg. Many came from left socialist groups that had split from the LSAP and from the former maoist movement who had already in 1979 been involved in the electoral Alternative List - Resist. In the 1984 elections, the party got two seats in the Chamber of Deputies. In 1985, however the GAP split and its more conservative wing founded the Green List Ecological Initiative (GLEI). They competed separately in the 1989 election, where they won two seats each.

1994–2003

In 1994, the two parties presented a common list for the elections. They won five seats in the Chamber, getting nearly 11% of the votes, which made them the fourth strongest force in parliament. In that year's European elections, which coincided with the national elections, the party won one of the six seats allotted to Luxembourg. In 1995, the two parties merged officially. That same year, the Greens' MEP, Jup Weber, left the party again, forming the Green and Liberal Alliance and joining the European Radical Alliance in the European Parliament.

In the 1999 elections, the party lost a considerable number of votes (falling to 9%), but retained its five seats in the Chamber and re-gained its single seat in the European Parliament.

Since 2004
In 2004, the Greens regained the ground that they had lost in 1999 and won two additional seats in the Chamber. Although they got 15% of the votes in the coinciding European elections, placing them third, they couldn't add to their single seat.

In the June 2009 elections, the Luxembourg Green Party further increased their European score to 16,83% and sent its outgoing MEP Claude Turmes to Brussels and Strasbourg for a third mandate. In the coinciding national elections, they kept a status quo (+0,13%). Its 7 Members of Parliament (MP) all got reelected. However, its longest serving MP and founding member Jean Huss declared the following day, that he would retire from parliamentary politics in 2011 to the benefit of Josée Lorsché.

In the 2013 general election, the Greens stagnated at 10.1% and their number of seats dropped to 6. However, they became part of a three-party-coalition government with the liberal Democratic Party (DP) and the Luxembourg Socialist Workers' Party (LSAP) led by DP's Xavier Bettel. The Greens now have three ministers: Félix Braz, Minister for Justice, François Bausch, Minister for Sustainable Development and Infrastructure and Carole Dieschbourg, Minister for the Environment. It is the first time that the Greens are part of a national government of Luxembourg.

Ideology and issues
The Greens are a typical green party. Sustainable development is one of their key issues. However, topics such as an ecological tax reform, renewable energy and energy efficiency or the consolidation of pension funds play an equally and ever increasingly important role. Especially in a country such as Luxembourg, pioneer of a new melting-pot society in Europe, equal participation of migrants is of utmost importance.

Furthermore, in its declaration of principles it has outlined, among others, the following priorities:
 Human rights and solidarity
 Democracy
 Social justice
 Structural change of the economy
 Equality between men and women
 A commitment to a green and social Europe.

Electoral results

Chamber of Deputies

European Parliament

Organisation

Organisational structure
The Congress is the highest organ of the party. It sets out the party's strategy and political course and is open to all members of the party. Every two years, the congress elects the leadership of the party's organisation: two presidents, an executive committee, the party board in which the party's youth wing and the gender council are also represented, an executive council that represents the congress, the treasurer and a financial control board.

International organisations
The Greens are member of the European Green Party and the Global Greens.

See also
Green party
Green politics
List of environmental organizations
List of political parties in Luxembourg

Notes

External links

Political parties in Luxembourg
Green political parties in Luxembourg
European Green Party
Political parties established in 1983
Global Greens member parties
1983 establishments in Luxembourg